PP-173 Lahore-XXX is a Constituency of Provincial Assembly of Punjab.

General elections 2018

See also
 PP-172 Lahore-XXIX
 PP-174 Kasur-I

References

External links
 Election commission Pakistan's official website
 Awazoday.com check result
 Official Website of Government of Punjab

Provincial constituencies of Punjab, Pakistan